The Athens Suburban Railway, is a is a five-line Proastiakos commuter rail service that connects the city of Athens with its metropolitan area and other regions beyond Attica, including Corinthia, Boeotia, Euboea and Achaea.

The first Proastiakos line, linking central Athens with Athens International Airport, was inaugurated two weeks before the 2004 Olympic Games. Over the years, the network has been successively expanded to Corinth (2005), Piraeus (2007), Kiato (2007), Chalcis (2009) and Aigio (2020).

History
"Proastiakos SA" was founded in 2003 as a subsidiary of OSE to serve the operation of the suburban network in the urban complex of Athens during the 2004 Olympic Games. The first line, linking central Athens with Athens International Airport, was inaugurated on 30 July 2004, two weeks before the 2004 Olympic Games. This first section was not electrified and operated DMU'S every half hour. In January 2005 the test routes to Corinth started and the line was delivered to the public on 27 September that same year. Also in 2005 Proastiakos was absorbed by the company TRAINOSE SA., which was now responsible for providing all rail passenger and commercial transport. In 2007, with the completion of the works of the Airport-Patras line to Kiato, Proastiakos expanded services on what is now Line 5 while in 2009 services where expanded to Chalkida forming Line 3. TrainOSE has been operating since 2008 as a company independent of OSE, still using the Proastiakos emblem. In 2009, with the Greek debt crisis unfolding OSE's Management was forced to reduce services across the network. Timetables were cut back, and routes closed as the government-run entity attempted to reduce overheads. Services from Athens Airport & Athens were cut back, with some ticket offices closing, reducing the reliability of services and passenger numbers.

However, from 2010, the electrification works of the lines with 25 kV AC, 50 Hz began to be completed, allowing the use of the Siemens Desiro 460 trains. The electrification projects were completed in the SKA department. - Kiato in 2010, on the Oinoi–Chalcis line in 2013, in the sections SKA-Oinoi and Treis Gefyres – SKA in 2015, and finally in the section Three Bridges – Piraeus in 2018. In fact, the advent of electrification in SS. Athenson July 30, 2017 led to the modification of the lines of the Suburban Railway to have as a starting point the central station of the capital. In 2017 OSE's passenger transport sector was privatised as TrainOSE, currently, a wholly owned subsidiary of Ferrovie dello Stato Italiane infrastructure, including stations, remained under the control of OSE. On 1 February 2018, the electrification of the Piraeus-Athens Central station section of the network was completed. The Athens Suburban Railway was extended to Aigio in 2020.

During the COVID-19 pandemic, TrainOSE provide free antiseptic gel to the passenger public in order to disinfect those who use the commuter train.

Lines and services
The Athens Suburban Railway consists of five routes: Piraeus–Airport via Athens, Piraeus–Kiato via Athens, Athens–Chalcis via Oinoi, Ano Liosia–Airport via Koropi, and Aigio–Athens/Airport via Kiato. Trains run from 4:30 am to midnight daily, and there are 53 stations in total.

On 18 January 2012, services were "temporarily" suspended on routes from Piraeus - Ano Liossia. According to a TrainOSE spokesperson, the interruption is due to technical problems; however no information on the progress of any work was given, services were rerouted via SKA.

Main services

The following table lists the routes and the stations for the Athens Suburban Railway since 15 May 2022:

List of Stations

The suburban railway connects with other rail services at the following stations:

Tickets and Scheduling

The suburban train, in the sections Magoula-Koropi and Piraeus-Dhekelia are part of the urban zone of OASA, therefore the single ticket that is used and combined with all means of transport in Athens is valid. Outside the urban area, a different ticket is valid, which is priced in stages and issued by Hellenic Train.

Photography on the network 
The photography in the publicly accessible areas of both OSE and the Athens Suburban Railway (defined as passenger space on trains and at stations) is permitted, as the right of photographers to photograph within the Suburban Railway is covered by the Constitution. The issue was mediated by the Ombudsman between 2004 and 2008 on the occasion of the attempt to temporarily ban photography during the Olympic Games. The court ruled that "the requirement of a 'photography permit' is tantamount to a ban" and that "there is no legal authority to impose restrictions on the right to photograph spaces and slides by definition accessible to the public".

Future expansion

New stations
Additional station in Kryoneri by 2021.
Additional station in Gerakas.

New services
Larissa Station-Agios Dionysios via Piraeus connection with Cretan ships, (with the final destination being Thessaloniki)
Reopening the suburban double line from SKA to Ano Liosia, MAK, Neoktista, Aspropyrgos Refineries, Old Aspropyrgos Station, and Elefsina, with the service of Hellenic Petroleum. The Elefsina line is planned to continue to Loutropyrgos and the old Megaron railway with a single regular line.
Reopening from Agios Apostolos to Isthmus.

Lavrio branch line
A nine-station, 32 km extension of the Athens Suburban Railway from Koropi to Lavrio was announced in 2016, potentially connecting 300,000 more people to the rail network at a cost of €160 million. The project involves the construction of two new stations at Markopoulo and Lavrio Port, and five intermediate stops at Kalyvia, Keratea, Daskaleio, Thorikos and Kyprianos. The Athens-Lavrio distance will be 55 minutes and Koropi-Lavrio 28 minutes with the completion of the extension.

Loutraki line reopening
In February 2019, OSE accepted a bid for the €12 million project to convert the former metre-gauge line between Isthmos and Loutraki to standard gauge, connect it to the Athens Airport–Patras railway and reopen it to passenger traffic by November 2021. Mytilineos–Xanthakis was selected as the contractor of the project. Due to an appeal by a rival bidder, the signing of the contract was delayed until 12 June 2019. The project consists of the electrification of the Isthmos–Loutraki line and building two new stops, one at Casino and the other in Loutraki.

Rafina branch
A €40 million branch line from Doukissis Plakentias station to the town of Rafina has also been proposed. with an extension to the Airport via Artemida and Rafina.

See also
 Hellenic Railways Organisation
 Hellenic Train
 Proastiakos
 Public transport in Athens
 Athens Metro
 Athens Airport–Patras railway
 Piraeus–Patras railway
 Proastiakos Patras
 Thessaloniki Suburban Railway
 Rail transport in Greece

References

Athens
Rail transport in Attica
Railway lines in highway medians
Transport in Athens